Kasipet is a census town in Mancherial district of the Indian state of Telangana.

Administrative Division 
Kasipet Mandal is now developing into a Digital Kasipet. The reason for this is the Kasipet Mandal App. 
By using This App... Local News, Bus timings and Gas Rate can be accessed via Mobile. There are 22 Villages in Kasipet Mandal.

References 

Villages in Mancherial district
Mandal headquarters in Mancherial district
Census towns in Adilabad district